Maša Janković (born 1 February 2000) is a Serbian basketball player for Innova TSN Leganés of the Liga Femenina de Baloncesto. Also, she represents Serbia national team internationally.

Playing career 
In June 2019, Janković signed a three-year contract with Crvena zvezda.

National team career
In June 2021, Janković  was a member of the Serbia national team that won the gold medal at the Eurobasket 2021 in Valencia, Spain.

Career achievements
 Serbian League: 2 (with Crvena zvezda: 2020–21, 2021–22)
 Serbian Cup: 1 (with Crvena zvezda: 2021–22)

References

External links
 Maša Janković at FIBA

2000 births
Living people
Serbian women's basketball players
Power forwards (basketball)
People from Vrbas, Serbia
ŽKK Crvena zvezda players
European champions for Serbia